Diego Francisco Viera Ruiz Díaz (born 30 April 1991), known as Diego Viera, is a Paraguayan footballer currently playing for Club Libertad of the Paraguayan Primera División.

Notes

References
 
 

1991 births
Living people
Paraguayan footballers
Paraguayan expatriate footballers
Paraguayan expatriate sportspeople in Argentina
Cerro Porteño players
Sportivo Luqueño players
Club Tacuary footballers
Club Libertad footballers
Godoy Cruz Antonio Tomba footballers
Paraguayan Primera División players
Argentine Primera División players
Expatriate footballers in Argentina
Sportspeople from Asunción
Association football defenders